Baker Creek is a community located in British Columbia, Canada, west of Quesnel along the Nazko highway, at the south end of Puntataenkut Lake. People in the community enjoy many outdoor activities such as fishing, hunting, boating, camping, and riding horses, ATVs and snowmobiles.

References

Populated places in the Cariboo Regional District
Unincorporated settlements in British Columbia